Rody may refer to:

People
Nicknames
 Rodrigo Duterte (born 1945), former President of the Philippines, referred to as "DU30" and "Rody"
 Roderick Rijnders (1941–2018), Dutch rower

Surname
 George E. Rody (1899–1956), U.S. basketball coach
 Vaughan Rody (born 1968), Canadian ice hockey official

Given name
 Rody Gorman (born 1960), Irish Scottish poet
 Rody Kenny Courtice (1891–1973), Canadian artist

See also
 Rodi (disambiguation)
 Roady (disambiguation)
 Roadie (disambiguation)
 Rhody (disambiguation)
 Rhodie
 Rhodey
 Bernard Shandon Rodey (1856–1927), Irish-American politician
 Rodey, New Mexico, USA